The BLU-109/B is a hardened penetration bomb used by the United States Air Force (BLU is an acronym for Bomb Live Unit). As with other "bunker busters", it is intended to penetrate concrete shelters and other hardened structures before exploding. In addition to the US, it is part of the armament of the air forces of Australia, Belgium, Canada, Denmark, France, Germany, Greece, Italy, Israel, Netherlands, Norway,  Pakistan, Saudi Arabia, United Kingdom and United Arab Emirates.

Design
It has a delayed-action tail-fuze. The BLU-109 entered service in 1985. It is also used as the warhead of some marks of the GBU-15 electro-optically guided bomb, the GBU-27 Paveway III laser-guided bomb, and the AGM-130 rocket-boosted weapon. This weapon can penetrate  of reinforced concrete, which is greater than the  capability of the Small Diameter Bomb.

Variants
The BLU-118 is reportedly a thermobaric explosive filler variation on the BLU-109 casing and basic bomb design.  It contains PBXIH-135, a traditional explosive.

In 2015 General Dynamics started a $7.2 million development of a version called HAMMER, which is intended to destroy chemical and biological substances by spreading dozens of Kinetic Fireballs Incendiaries (KFI) (not explosions) inside a bunker.  The KFIs have evolved out of the Small Business Innovation Research (SBIR) program by Exquadrum, Inc. of Adelanto, California.

Operators
The BLU-109 has been sold to key US allies including South Korea, Israel, Greece, Saudi Arabia, UAE, Pakistan and Turkey

 :  United States Air Force
  Royal Moroccan Air Force
 :  Republic of Korea Air Force
 :  Hellenic Air Force
 :  Turkish Air Force
 :  Israeli Air Force
 :  Serbian Air Force
 : Pakistan Air Force
 :  Royal Saudi Air Force
 :  United Arab Emirates Air Force
 : Royal Netherlands Air Force

See also
 BLU-116

References

External links

 BLU-109/B Hard-target Warhead fact sheet, at Hill AFB website, US air Force

Aerial bombs of the United States
Military equipment introduced in the 1980s